The Calalzo–Padua railway is a railway line in Veneto, Italy.

The section from Camposampiero to Padua was opened in 1877 as a part of the Bassano–Padua railway. In 1886 it followed the section from Belluno to Camposampiero. The final section to Calalzo di Cadore was finished in 1914.

See also 
 List of railway lines in Italy

References

Footnotes

Bibliography 
 RFI - Fascicolo linea 54
 

Railway lines in Veneto
Railway lines opened in 1914